"True To Form" is a song by British electronic music band Hybrid featuring Peter Hook, released as the first single from their second studio album Morning Sci-Fi on 15 September 2003. This song was made in collaboration with Hook, with vocals performed by Adam Taylor.

Track listings

 Radio Edit – 3:51
 Hybrid Club Mix – 5:30
 Creamer & K Club Mix – 11:17

Versions
"True To Form" (versions), were also released on Distinct'ive Records, with a different track list.

 Club Edit – 5:33
 Acoustic Version – 2:42
 Full Length – 9:11

Digital version
On iTunes 5 tracks where included in the single. The songs were released on iTunes on February 23, 2005.

 Radio Edit – 3:55
 Club Edit – 5:33
 Acoustic Version – 2:42
 Full Length Version – 9:11
 John Creamer & Stephane K Club Mix – 11:17 (album only)

Charts

Trivia
 With each remix of True To Form, none of them include Peter Hook's basslines. In July 2002. Peter told the band: "None of these bloody remixers ever use my bass lines. I put in all this time and effort yet they use Bernard's vocals but they don't even use my bass."
 An unreleased mix can be heard at Hybrid's website and the bonus DVD bundled with the CD release of Morning Sci-Fi.

References

2003 singles
Hybrid (British band) songs
2003 songs
Songs written by Peter Hook